Fredrik Eric Nelson, Jr. (born December 4, 1960 in Charleston, West Virginia) is an American politician and a former Republican member of the West Virginia House of Delegates, having represented District 35 from January 12, 2013 until December 1, 2020. Nelson served consecutively from January 2011 until January 2013 in the District 30 seat.
After his tenure in the West Virginia House of Delegates, he went on to run for District 17 in the West Virginia Senate, which he subsequently won in November 3, 2020 general election. He was sworn in as State Senator on December 1, 2020.

Education
Nelson earned his BS degrees in accounting and business administration from Washington and Lee University.

Elections
2012 Redistricted to District 35, Nelson ran in the ten-way May 8, 2012 Republican Primary and placed first with 2,606 votes (18.5%), and placed third in the eight-way four-position November 6, 2012 General election with 13,397 votes (14.2%), behind incumbent Democratic Representative Doug Skaff, fellow Republican Suzette Raines and ahead of fellow Republican selectee John McCuskey and non-selectees incumbent Democratic Representatives Bobbie Hatfield and Bonnie Brown, Democratic nominee Chris Morris, and fellow Republican nominee Fred Joseph.
2010 Originally in District 30, O'Neal ran in the eight-way May 11, 2010 Republican Primary and placed first with 2,963 votes (16.0%), and placed second in the fourteen-way seven-position November 2, 2010 General election with 17,603 votes (8.0%) behind incumbent Democratic Representative Doug Skaff and ahead of incumbents Daniel Wells (D), Bobbie Hatfield (D), Bonnie Brown (D), Mark Hunt (D), and Nancy Guthrie (D).

References

External links
Official page at the West Virginia Legislature
Campaign site

Eric Nelson at Ballotpedia
Eric Nelson at the National Institute on Money in State Politics

1960 births
Living people
Republican Party members of the West Virginia House of Delegates
Politicians from Charleston, West Virginia
Washington and Lee University alumni
21st-century American politicians